Carol Telbisz (1853 – 14 July 1914) was an Austro-Hungarian public figure of Banat Bulgarian origin and a long-time Mayor of Temesvár (modern Timișoara, Romania).

Born in Cenad, Austrian Empire, (today in Romania) and descending from the old Banat Bulgarian family of Telbiz from Stár Bišnov (today Dudeștii Vechi, Romania), Telbisz graduated in law from the University of Budapest and later took a doctor's degree in administrative law from the University of Vienna. He was awarded the noble title of Baron. 

Between 1885 and 1914, Telbisz was mayor of Temesvár, the capital of the Banat. During his term in office, he contributed a great deal to the city's modernization, destroying the old fortifications and reshaping the city according to a new Western European urbanization plan, with wide boulevards, sewerage, water supply, electrification and an electric-powered rail public transport.  During his term in office, Temesvár boasted the earliest first aid station in modern Hungary besides the first asphalt-paved street (1895) and the first electric tram (1899) in what is today Romania. Upon the end of his mayoralty, some considered Timișoara as Austria-Hungary's third city in importance, after Vienna and Budapest.

Footnotes

References 
 
 
 

Austro-Hungarian politicians
Banat Bulgarian people
Bulgarian Roman Catholics
Bulgarian Austro-Hungarians
Hungarian nobility
People from Timiș County
Mayors of Timișoara
University of Vienna alumni
1853 births
1914 deaths